Francis Emil Billock  (May 20, 1912 – October 11, 1964) was an American football lineman who played in the National Football League (NFL) with the Pittsburgh Pirates.

Early life
Billock  was born in Grand Rapids, Minnesota and  attended Grand Rapids High School.
Frank was one of eight children. Frank married Clairnita Steinmetz on December 27, 1937. They had three daughters Janet, Mary Elizabeth, and Judith.
He attended college at Saint Mary's College, Winona, Minnesota on a football scholarship. Frank served in the United States Navy as a gunnery instructor at the Norman Oklahoma Naval Base before being assigned to a ship for overseas duty. Lieutenant JG Francis E. Billock received an honorable discharge from the U.S. Navy December 9, 1945.

Professional football
Billock was acquired by the Pittsburgh Pirates in September 1937 in a trade with the Chicago Cardinals for center Lee Mulleneaux.  Billock had played previously with a professional team, the Heileman Lagers in La Crosse, Wisconsin.  He was with Pittsburgh for roughly a month during which time he played in two games, starting one.  He was released by the Pirates in October 1937.

Personal
Billock died in Wauwatosa, Wisconsin at the age of 52.

References

1912 births
1964 deaths
American football guards
American football tackles
Pittsburgh Pirates (football) players
Saint Mary's Redmen football players
Players of American football from Grand Rapids, Michigan